Leonardo Lavalle Moreno (born 14 July 1967) is a former tennis player from Mexico, who turned professional in 1985. He represented his native country at the 1992 Summer Olympics in Barcelona, where he was defeated in the quarterfinals by Spain's eventual runner up Jordi Arrese. The left-hander won one career title in singles (Tel Aviv, 1991). He reached his highest singles ATP-ranking on 17 March 1986, when he became world No. 51.

Lavalle won the Wimbledon boys' junior singles and doubles title in 1985. His singles win was notable for the fact that the men's singles winner that year Boris Becker was younger than Leonardo. He was later a runner-up in doubles at Wimbledon in 1991 and a Wimbledon doubles semifinalist in 1989 and 1990.

Junior Grand Slam finals

Singles: 1 (1 title)

Doubles: 1 (1 title)

ATP career finals

Singles: 2 (1 title, 1 runner-up)

Doubles: 10 (5 titles, 5 runner-ups)

ATP Challenger and ITF Futures finals

Singles: 5 (4–1)

Doubles: 11 (9–2)

Performance timelines

Singles

Doubles

Mixed doubles

External links
 
 
 
 

1967 births
Living people
Mexican male tennis players
Olympic tennis players of Mexico
Tennis players from Mexico City
Tennis players at the 1988 Summer Olympics
Tennis players at the 1992 Summer Olympics
US Open (tennis) junior champions
Wimbledon junior champions
Grand Slam (tennis) champions in boys' singles
Grand Slam (tennis) champions in boys' doubles
20th-century Mexican people